The Electoral division of Queenborough was an electoral division in the Tasmanian Legislative Council of Australia. It existed from 1946, when the seat of Hobart was changed from three members to one, to 1999, when it was renamed Nelson.

Members

See also
Tasmanian Legislative Council electoral divisions

References
Past election results for Queenborough

Former electoral districts of Tasmania
1999 disestablishments in Australia